CPS or cps may refer to:

Organisations

Australia
 Cat Protection Society of NSW, a cat shelter in Newtown, Sydney
 Chatswood Public School, a school in Sydney

Canada
 Calgary Police Service, the police service for the city of Calgary, Alberta
 Canadian Pacific Survey
 Canadian Paediatric Society
 Canadian Power and Sail Squadrons, an association that teaches safe boating
 Compendium of Pharmaceuticals and Specialties, drug reference for healthcare providers

United Kingdom
 Cambridge Philosophical Society, a scientific society at the University of Cambridge
 Cambridge Positioning Systems, a GPS software company bought by CSR
 Centre for Planetary Science, at Birkbeck, University of London
 Centre for Policy Studies, a British think-tank
 College of Psychic Studies, a non-profit organisation based in London
 Communist Party of Scotland
 Crown Prosecution Service, in England and Wales

United States
 Cambridge Public School District, Cambridge, Massachusetts
 Center for the Partially Sighted, an agency that promotes independent living for people with impaired sight, in Los Angeles, California
 Chicago Public Schools
 Child Protective Services, the name used in many United States jurisdictions for a state or local government agency which investigates child abuse and neglect
 ChoicePoint, whose New York Stock Exchange symbol was CPS until its buyout by Reed Elsevier
 Cincinnati Public Schools, Hamilton County, Ohio
 Civilian Public Service, a national system of work camps for conscientious objectors in the United States during World War II
 Cleveland Photographic Society, a non-profit photography organization, based in Cleveland, Ohio, USA
 Coalition for Positive Sexuality, a self-described "guerrilla sex education" group
 The College Preparatory School, a high school in Oakland, California
 Columbia Public Schools, Missouri
 CPS Energy, formerly "City Public Service", San Antonio's municipally owned natural gas and electric company

Elsewhere
 CPS (programadora) (Comunicaciones Producción y Servicios de Televisión), a Colombian programadora that operated between 1998 and 2003
 Colegio de la Preciosa Sangre de Pichilemu, a school in Pichilemu, Chile
 College of Physicians and Surgeons (disambiguation)
 Committee of Public Safety, the de facto executive government in France, 1793–1794
 Conference of Presentation Sisters of North America, a congregation of the Presentation Sisters religious order
 Convention Panafricaine Sankariste, Burkina Faso

Science and technology

Biology and chemistry
 Capsaicin, a pungent component of chili peppers
 Carbamoyl phosphate synthase II, an enzyme that catalyzes a reaction yielding carbamoyl phosphate
 Carbamoyl phosphate synthetase, an enzyme that catalyzes a reaction yielding carbamoyl phosphate
 Chlorpyrifos, an organophosphate pesticide
 Concentrate of poppy straw, processed poppy straw
 Circumsporozoite protein, a protein secreted by the malaria parasite during the sporozoite stage

Computing
 CPS, a file format for raster graphics images produced by Corel Photo House
 Certification Practice Statement, legal document that describes how the Certificate Authority manages the certificates it issues
 Characters Per Second, in printers
 Citrix Presentation Server, now known as Citrix XenApp
 Continuation-passing style, a programming technique
 Conversational Programming System, an early time sharing operating system that ran on IBM System/360 mainframes
 CP System, arcade system boards manufactured by Capcom in the early and late 1990s

Engineering
 Cyber-physical system, the tight conjoining of and coordination between computational and physical resources
 Crankshaft position sensor, an electronic device used in IC engines to monitor the position of the crankshaft

Medicine
 Cancer Prevention Study, a series of epidemiological studies conducted by the American Cancer Society
 Chronic pain syndrome, an ongoing pain disorder
 Complex partial seizure, a type of partial seizure

Physics
 Centipoise (cP), a unit of poise, a measurement of viscosity, sometimes written cps or cPs
CERN Proton Synchrotron, a particle accelerator
 Counts per second (cps), also counts per minute (cpm), the rate at which ionising events are detected by a radiological measurement instrument
 Cycle per second (c.p.s.), a unit of frequency now known as Hertz

Telecommunications
 Calls per second, the measurement system of call volume in telephony or other telecommunications
 Carrier preselect, a landline telephone option that lets European customers use a third party for call charges

Transport
 Clapham South tube station, London, London Underground station code
 IATA code for St. Louis Downtown Airport, formerly Curtiss-Parks Airport and originally Curtiss-Steinberg Airport

Other uses
 Central Park South, a street in New York City
 Central Police Station (disambiguation)
 Classroom Performance Systems, a technological student assessment system
 Clerk Police Sergeant, or Clerk Sergeant, a former rank of station sergeant in the London Metropolitan Police
 Collaborative problem-solving, people working together face-to-face or in online workspaces
 Combination Product Set, all ways of choosing the product of m distinct values from a set of n primes, used in hexany
 Constant Pressure System, a design used in water guns
 Cost-per-sale, an online advertising pricing system
 Crane, Poole & Schmidt, a fictional law firm in the television series Boston Legal
 Current Population Survey, a statistical survey conducted by the United States Census Bureau for the Bureau of Labor Statistics